Curaçao competed at the 2022 World Aquatics Championships in Budapest, Hungary from 17 June to 3 July.

Artistic swimming

Curaçao entered one artistic swimmer.

Women

Swimming

Curaçao entered two swimmers.

Men

Women

References

Nations at the 2022 World Aquatics Championships
Curaçao at the World Aquatics Championships
World Aquatics Championships